"Southern Hospitality" is the second single released off Ludacris's album Back for the First Time, released in early 2001. It was composed by The Neptunes. The song debuted at #86 on the Billboard Hot 100 on the issue dated January 20, 2001,  peaking at #23 on the issue dated March 24.

Music video

The official music video for the song was directed by Jeremy Rall. The video features cameo appearances by Lil Jon, Jazze Pha, Scarface and Too Short.

Chart performance
"Southern Hospitality" peaked at number 5 on the Billboard rap chart and number 6 on the R&B/hip-hop chart. On the Billboard Hot 100, it reached number 23.

Weekly charts

Year-end charts

References

2000 songs
2001 singles
Def Jam Recordings singles
Ludacris songs
Music videos directed by Jeremy Rall
Song recordings produced by the Neptunes
Songs written by Ludacris
Songs written by Pharrell Williams